Pseudautomeris toulgoeti is a species of butterfly which belongs to the family of saturniids (Saturniidae).

Appearance 

Medium-sized (wingspan 60-80 millimetres), brown saturniids with large eye markings on their back wings. The front wings are slightly tapered, but not sickle-shaped, most often with a long stripe. he base color of the hind wing is often reddish, the eye spot has a bluish core.

Life cycle 

The larvae tend to live socially, at least as young, on different shrubs and trees. Like other saturniidae, the adults have reduced mouths, and they do not feed. The species fly at night, during the day they rest between withered leaves where they are well camouflaged. Should an animal still detect the butterfly, it opens the distortions so that the "staring" eye spots appear - this is often enough to scare away a small predator.

Urticating hair 

The larvae, partly the adult butterflies, are covered with urticating hair. These release poison if you come in contact with them and can trigger skin irritation, sometimes even more serious complications. The larvae tend to sit in tight junctions on tree trunks, and are quite well camouflaged, so that one can inadvertently easily contact them.

Distribution 

The detailed distribution of this species is not known.

References 

 Markku Savela's Lepidoptera and some other life forms: Checklist of the species. 13.11. 2012.
 Cahurel, A. Saturniidae de Guyane française: Hemileucinae 
 Pictures of the species
 Moths of the Andes - Pseudautomeris irene 

Saturniidae